Nathan David Coy (born July 24, 1978) is an American mixed martial artist who most recently competed in the Welterweight division of the UFC. A professional competitor since 2008, he has also competed for Bellator, the MFC, and Strikeforce.

Wrestling
A former wrestler for Oregon State University, he wrestled in the 174 pounds weight category. Nathan was an All-American and two-time Pac-10 champion and received a degree in Sociology at Oregon State University.

Mixed martial arts career
In the beginning of his MMA career Coy was very successful, winning his first five fights. However, he went on to lose to future UFC fighters Brian Foster and Paul Bradley consecutively.  Then posted three straight first round finishes.

Strikeforce
Coy made his debut for Strikeforce back in 2008, defeating Dave Courchaine by KO in the 1st round. In 2010, Coy returned to face Tyron Woodley at ShoMMA 8: Lindland vs. Casey, but lost by split decision.

His next fight for Strikeforce was scheduled to be against Nate Moore at ShoMMA 13: Woodley vs. Saffiedine. The fight instead took place at Strikeforce: Diaz vs. Cyborg which Coy lost via KO in the second round.

Maximum Fighting Championship
Coy made his MFC Debut on January 27, 2012 against Dhiego Lima at MFC 32, Coy won via Unanimous Decision.

Coy defeated Ultimate Fighter Alumni Ryan McGillivray on May 4, 2012 at MFC 33 via third round Doctor Stoppage to win the MFC Welterweight Championship.

Bellator MMA
Coy made his debut with Bellator MMA in September 2013 where he defeated Andy Uhrich.

In March 2014, he entered into the Bellator Season 10 Welterweight tournament.  He faced Paul Bradley in the opening round on March 14, 2014 at Bellator 112 and won the fight via unanimous decision.

In the semifinals, Coy faced Adam McDonough at Bellator 116 on April 11, 2014. Coy lost via second-round KO.

Coy has since been released from the promotion.

The Ultimate Fighter: American Top Team vs. Blackzilians

Nathan Coy was confirmed as a cast member for The Ultimate Fighter 21 representing American Top Team.

Ultimate Fighting Championship
Coy faced Danny Roberts on December 10, 2015 at UFC Fight Night 80, replacing an injured Michael Graves. He lost the fight via technical submission in the first round.

Coy next faced Jonavin Webb on February 21, 2016 at UFC Fight Night 83. He won the fight via unanimous decision.

Coy faced Zak Cummings on April 15, 2017 at UFC on Fox 24. He lost the fight via technical submission due to a guillotine choke in the first round.

On February 11, 2020, news surfaced that Coy was released from the promotion.

Personal life
Coy is married to his wife Cristina and has one daughter and two sons.

Championships and accomplishments
Maximum Fighting Championship
MFC Welterweight Championship (One time)
SportFight MMA
SportFight Welterweight Championship (One time)

Mixed martial arts record

|-
|Loss
|align=center|15–7
|Zak Cummings
|Technical Submission (guillotine choke)
|UFC on Fox: Johnson vs. Reis
|
|align=center|1
|align=center|4:21
|Kansas City, Missouri, United States
|
|-
| Win
|align=center| 15–6
|Jonavin Webb
| Decision (unanimous)
|UFC Fight Night: Cowboy vs. Cowboy
|
|align=center|3
|align=center|5:00
|Pittsburgh, Pennsylvania, United States
|
|-
|Loss
| align=center| 14–6
| Danny Roberts
| Technical Submission (triangle choke)
| UFC Fight Night: Namajunas vs. VanZant
| 
| align=center|1
| align=center|2:46
|Las Vegas, Nevada, United States
|   
|-
| Loss
| align=center| 14–5
| Adam McDonough
| TKO (punch)
| Bellator 116
| 
| align=center| 2
| align=center| 0:30
| Temecula, California, United States
| Bellator Season 10 Welterweight Tournament Semifinal.
|-
| Win
| align=center| 14–4
| Paul Bradley
| Decision (unanimous)
| Bellator 112
| 
| align=center| 3
| align=center| 5:00
| Hammond, Indiana, United States
| Bellator Season 10 Welterweight Tournament Quarterfinal.
|-
| Win
| align=center| 13–4
| Andy Uhrich
| Decision (unanimous)
| Bellator 101
| 
| align=center| 3
| align=center| 5:00
| Portland, Oregon, United States
| 
|-
| Win
| align=center| 12–4
| Kevin Nowaczyk
| Decision (unanimous)
| Hoosier Fight Club 14
| 
| align=center| 3
| align=center| 5:00
| Valparaiso, Indiana, United States
| 
|-
| Win
| align=center| 11–4
| Ryan McGillivray
| TKO (doctor stoppage)
| MFC 33
| 
| align=center| 3
| align=center| 5:00
| Edmonton, Alberta, Canada
| 
|-
| Win
| align=center| 10–4
| Dhiego Lima
| Decision (unanimous)
| MFC 32
| 
| align=center| 3
| align=center| 5:00
| Edmonton, Alberta, Canada
| 
|-
| Win
| align=center| 9–4
| Patrick Mikesz
| Decision (unanimous)
| Warrior-1 MMA 7: Reloaded
| 
| align=center| 3
| align=center| 5:00
| Coral Gables, Florida, United States
| 
|-
| Loss
| align=center| 8–4
| Nate Moore
| KO (punches)
| Strikeforce: Diaz vs. Cyborg
| 
| align=center| 2
| align=center| 0:25
| Nashville, Tennessee, United States
| 
|-
| Loss
| align=center| 8–3
| Tyron Woodley
| Decision (split)
| Strikeforce Challengers: Lindland vs. Casey
| 
| align=center| 3
| align=center| 5:00
| Portland, Oregon, United States
| 
|-
| Win
| align=center| 8–2
| Travis Bush
| Submission (punches)
| Sportfight 27: Wild Card
| 
| align=center| 1
| align=center| 0:16
| Grande Ronde, Oregon, United States
| 
|-
| Win
| align=center| 7–2
| Chris Albandia
| Submission (arm-triangle choke)
| Raw Power MMA 1
| 
| align=center| 1
| align=center| 3:00
| Sanabis, Bahrain
| 
|-
| Win
| align=center| 6–2
| JT Taylor
| TKO (punches)
| CageSport 6
| 
| align=center| 1
| align=center| 3:39
| Tacoma, Washington, United States
| 
|-
| Loss
| align=center| 5–2
| Paul Bradley
| Decision (split)
| World Cagefighting Alliance: Pure Combat
| 
| align=center| 3
| align=center| 5:00
| Atlantic City, New Jersey, United States
| 
|-
| Loss
| align=center| 5–1
| Brian Foster
| Submission (kimura)
| Pro Battle MMA: Immediate Impact 
| 
| align=center| 1
| align=center| 4:08
| Springdale, Arkansas, United States
| 
|-
| Win
| align=center| 5–0
| Mike Pierce
| Decision (unanimous)
| SportFight 23: Heated Rivals
| 
| align=center| 5
| align=center| 5:00
| Portland, Oregon, United States
| 
|-
| Win
| align=center| 4–0
| Jerrod Jones
| Submission (punches)
| SportFight 22: Re-Awakening
| 
| align=center| 2
| align=center| 2:37
| Portland, Oregon, United States
| 
|-
| Win
| align=center| 3–0
| Dave Courchaine
| TKO (punches)
| Strikeforce: At The Dome
| 
| align=center| 1
| align=center| 0:46
| Tacoma, Washington, United States
| 
|-
| Win
| align=center| 2–0
| Rick Story
| Decision (unanimous)
| SportFight 21: Seasons Beatings
| 
| align=center| 3
| align=center| 5:00
| Portland, Oregon, United States
| 
|-
| Win
| align=center| 1–0
| Aaron Emerson
| Submission
| SportFight 20: Homecoming
| 
| align=center| 2
| align=center| N/A
| Portland, Oregon, United States
|

Mixed martial arts exhibition record

|-
| Win
| align=center| 1–1
| Valdir Araújo
| Decision (unanimous)
| The Ultimate Fighter 21
| June 24, 2015 (airdate)
| align=center| 2
| align=center| 5:00
| Boca Raton, Florida, United States
| 
|-
| Loss
| align=center| 0–1
| Vicente Luque
| Submission (anaconda choke)
| The Ultimate Fighter 21
| June 3, 2015 (airdate)
| align=center| 3
| align=center| 2:26
| Boca Raton, Florida, United States
|

See also
 List of current mixed martial arts champions
 List of male mixed martial artists

References

External links
 
 

Living people
American male mixed martial artists
Mixed martial artists from Oregon
Oregon State Beavers wrestlers
Welterweight mixed martial artists
Mixed martial artists utilizing collegiate wrestling
1978 births
Wrestlers from Oregon
People from Coconut Creek, Florida
Ultimate Fighting Championship male fighters
Sportspeople from Portland, Oregon